The New York State Dental Foundation (NYSDF) is an American not-for-profit organization established in 1980. Based in Albany, NY, the New York State Dental Foundation performs dental education and outreach programs for the public. NYSDF seeks to address the educational and humanitarian commitments of the New York State Dental Association.

Overview
The New York State Dental Foundation, which was incorporated in 1980, was established to foster a statewide approach to the advancement of the art and science of dentistry, dental education, and to improve the quality of dental care by:

Assisting dentists and their staffs to advance their skills and knowledge.
Encouraging the establishment and support of student aid programs.
The creation of grants to appropriate agencies for purposes of research.
The creation of grants to dental schools or other organizations involved in the education of dentists.
Increasing the public's understanding of and access to dental services.

The New York State Dental Foundation is an ADA-CERP approved provider of continuing education, and the Foundation's executive director serves on the steering committee for the New York State Oral Health Coalition.

Outreach
The New York State Dental Foundation remains committed to the advancement of the art and science of dentistry. The Foundation has published reports on the issuance of volunteer licensure  and has created statewide programs to aid in the implementation of New York State's new dental health certificate law. The Foundation has worked with the assistance of a grant from the American Dental Association to recruit dentist who are willing to offer free or reduced dental assessments for children.

Significant Recent Events
2006: Foundation hosts first annual Foundations of Excellence Awards.
2007: Foundation hosts historic program on diversity in the dental profession.
2008: Foundation screens nearly 600 children at the NYS Fair in August and hosts landmark summit on HIV and AIDS in October 2008.
2009: NYSDF awards Give Kids a Smile grants to six organizations in New York State. NYSDF plans to host an October 2009 Conference on Oral Pathology with an entire day dedicated to training dentists to offer rapid HIV testing in the dental chair.

External links

References

Dental organizations based in the United States
Medical and health organizations based in New York (state)
1980 establishments in New York (state)